Mário Kurák (born 30 November 1983) is a professional Slovak footballer who currently plays for DOXXbet liga club FK Poprad as a midfielder.

Club career

MFK Skalica
He made his professional Fortuna Liga debut for MFK Skalica against MFK Ružomberok on 18 July 2015.

References

External links
 
 Futbalnet profile
 Eurofotbal profile

1983 births
Living people
Slovak footballers
Association football midfielders
FK Železiarne Podbrezová players
FK Čáslav players
FK Mladá Boleslav players
TJ Baník Ružiná players
Kaposvári Rákóczi FC players
MŠK Rimavská Sobota players
MFK Tatran Liptovský Mikuláš players
MFK Skalica players
FK Dukla Banská Bystrica players
FK Poprad players
Slovak Super Liga players
Expatriate footballers in the Czech Republic
Expatriate footballers in Hungary